This is a list of notable players who have played for Trabzonspor Kulübü. Trabzonspor were founded in 1967 after a merger of several Trabzon based clubs. The club made their début in the 2.Lig and joined the 1.Lig for the first time seven years later.

List of players 
The following list includes all Trabzonspor players that have played 100 or more competitive matches for the club in league (2.Lig, 1.Lig/Süper Lig) and cup (Turkish Cup) play.

Players are listed with their first-team début and last appearance for the club, along with appearances and goals. Some dates are approximate and are listed in italics. Statistics are correct as of 6 June 2010.

Notes 

Trabzonspor
 
Trabzonspor
Association football player non-biographical articles